Self-domestication is the process of adaptation of for example wild animals to cohabiting with humans, without direct human selective breeding of the animals. The human self-domestication hypothesis argues that, like mammalian domesticates, humans have gone through a process of selection against aggression – a process that in the case of humans was self-induced, in favor of social behavior from which the group as a whole benefited, such as intelligence, soft skills, emotional intelligence and where individuals with an antisocial personality disorder would be eliminated by the group.  For this to happen, sophisticated language was necessary to plot against the bully or individual with excessive aggressive behavior, so one would not be killed themselves.  It is hypothesized that this is what differentiated Homo erectus and Homo neanderthalensis from H. sapiens: the ability of sophisticated language, allowing better social collaboration, elimination of excessive aggressive behavior in the group, leading to self-domestication and could explain why only homo sapiens survived from all the hominae.
Dogs and cats have undergone this kind of self-domestication. Self-domestication also refers to the evolution of hominids, particularly humans and bonobos, toward collaborative, docile behavior. As described by British biological anthropologist Richard Wrangham, self-domestication involves being in an environment that favors reduction in aggression, including interspecific and intraspecific antagonism, for survival. Spandrels, or evolutionary byproducts, also accompany self-domestication, including depigmentation, arrested development, and reduced sexual dimorphism.

In animals
Wild animals may self-domesticate when less aggressive behavior enhances their survival in the vicinity of human beings. This facilitates their ability to take advantage of increased food availability arising from domestic niches. Alternatively, when occurring in non-human environments, self-domestication may be favored by prosociality, as traits arising from self-domestication lead to stronger social structures. An environment that supports the survival of self-domesticated animals can lead to other apparent changes in behavior and appearance that deviate from their wild phenotypes. These traits include, but are not limited to, depigmentation, floppy ears, curly tails, smaller teeth, smaller cranial anatomy, juvenile behavior, reduced sexual dimorphism, and arrested development. Smaller skulls, increased playfulness, and reduced aggression have also been observed in self-domesticated species.

Red foxes
British cities have populations of red foxes that have established themselves in urban areas, and shows the first signs of self-domestication. Compared to their rural relatives, the urban foxes have adapted to their environment by evolving shorter jaws and smaller brain.

Cats
As grain plants and livestock became domesticated 9,000 years ago in the Fertile Crescent, hunter-gatherers built urban villages. After a 100,000-year history of nomadism, these hunter-gatherers transitioned to adopting a sedentary lifestyle. Though many societies domesticated barnyard animals for food resources—an example of artificial selection—villagers had little desire or motivation to domesticate wildcats to be house pets. Instead, wildcats, such as the species Felis lybica, began exploiting new resources offered by human environments, such as a proliferation of rodents in grain stores. These cats were tolerated by people, supporting their natural evolution to deviate further from their wild counterparts. This favored the perpetuation of reduced aggressive behavior and increased “tameness,” which made the cats increasingly tolerable in human society.

Dogs

Noticing that a dog's skull looks like that of a juvenile wolf, Richard Wrangham suggested that this species could self-domesticate. While some humans may have intentionally domesticated wolves into dogs, this alternate hypothesis states that wolves effectively domesticated themselves by establishing a mutually beneficial relationship with prehistoric humans. They scavenged on the remains of the prey animals left by the prehistoric people at the human settlements or the kill sites. Those wolves that were less anxious and aggressive thrived, continued to follow the prehistoric humans, and colonized the human-dominated environments, generation after generation. Gradually, the first primitive dogs emerged from this group.

Bonobos (Pan paniscus)
The evolutionary anthropologist Brian Hare proposed that bonobos (Pan paniscus) have also undergone self-domestication. Despite their close relation to chimpanzees, bonobos exhibit significantly lower levels of aggression. Male chimpanzees use intimidating displays to compete for resources, access to mating, and dominance rank. Both female and male chimpanzees may instigate infanticide. In comparison, bonobos deliver calm displays, the most aggressive action ever being using branches merely as a prop, never to make physical contact with another bonobo. Females are organized in coalitions, minimizing if not eliminating intimidation by males for mating. Males do not form alliances with other male bonobo; instead, male-female bonobo alliances are prolific, with strong bonds between mother and sons. Intergroup tolerance is much higher in bonobos in contrast to chimpanzees. Additionally, bonobo adults are known to engage in play much more frequently than chimpanzee adults, suggesting that bonobos showcase more juvenilized behavior. The cognitive traits that have caused these phenotypic differences to arise are not fully clear; however, cognitive differences between bonobos and chimpanzees have been established in the orbitofrontal cortex, motor cortices, and hippocampus. These neural regions are associated with feeding habits, motor coordination, and emotions.

It remains a point of discussion why the mechanism of natural selection has favored self-domestication in bonobos over time. One theory suggests that self-domestication reinforces stable social structures, favoring prosocial behavior; thus, self-domestication has predominantly been motivated by changing intraspecific dynamics. Bonobo groups are more stable than chimpanzee groups, due to their decreased reliance on scramble competition. Bonobo social groups consist of a significant percentage of each local community, often 16-21% more inclusive of the total population than chimpanzee groups. Since female-female coalitions are so strong, intimidating, coercive approaches for mating and high-ranks are not as fruitful; males find greater reproductive success from kinship ties with mothers.

In addition to these behavioral observations, morphological evidence supports the hypothesis that bonobos, unlike the closely related chimpanzees, have undergone self-domestication. Bonobos, who also exhibit less aggressive demeanors, have a cranial reduction up to 20%, flattening of facial projection, and diminished sexual dimorphism. Bonobos also have smaller teeth. Their white tail-tufts and pink lips, coloration typically observed in juvenile primates, is persistent in phenotypes of adult bonobos; this depigmentation signals extended periods of juvenilized traits.

Marmoset monkeys (Callithrix jacchus) 
The neuroscientist Asif A. Ghazanfar revisited the self-domestication hypothesis in marmoset monkeys, a previously undocumented species in application to the theory. The study sought to elucidate how affiliative behavior facilitates the development of domestic phenotypes and determine the social underpinnings behind self-domestication's natural selection. So, the researchers identified both an affiliative behavior and a hallmark morphological trait indicating domestication: in marmoset monkeys, these would be vocal exchanges and a species-distinctive white facial fur patch. Their study found that, when marmoset parents provide more vocal feedback to their offspring, juvenile marmosets correspondingly undergo a larger growth of their white facial fur patch. This white facial patch lacked melanocytes, which originate from neural crest cells, suggesting that there exists a pleiotropic linkage with neural crest cells. This is a significant finding in support of the hypothesis, as neural crest cell abundance is directly related to the adrenal gland size. Lower aggression, as arises from self-domestication, also is accompanied by a smaller adrenal gland, due to a decreased urgency to mitigate stressful conditions. A smaller adrenal gland means that there will be fewer neural crest cells, and thereby melanocytes; the phenotypic result will be a reduction in pigmentation, a common byproduct of self-domestication, as is observed in the marmoset monkeys.

Ghazanfar's study with marmoset monkeys further substantiated the self-domestication hypothesis, which has also emerged in humans. He proposed that the common denominator, and thus a likely driver and selective pressure of domestication, between both marmosets and humans was cooperative breeding. In marmosets, cooperative breeding was a mating system driven by their production of dizygotic twins, whereas in humans, it may be driven due to the extensive amount of parental care that goes into an offspring's early years of development.

In humans

Hominids 
Clark & Henneberg argue that during the earliest stages of human evolution a more paedomorphic skull arose through self-domestication. This assertion is based upon a comparison of the skull of Ardipithecus and chimpanzees of various ages. It was found that Ardipithecus clustered with the infant and juvenile species. The consequent lack of a pubertal growth spurt in males of the species and the consequent growth of aggressive canine armoury was taken as evidence that Ardipithecus evolved its paedomorphic skull through self domestication. As the authors state, comparing the species with bonobos:

"Of course A. ramidus differs significantly from bonobos, bonobos having retained a functional canine honing complex. However, the fact that A. ramidus shares with bonobos reduced sexual dimorphism, and a more paedomorphic form relative to chimpanzees, suggests that the developmental and social adaptations evident in bonobos may be of assistance in future reconstructions of early hominin social and sexual psychology. In fact the trend towards increased maternal care, female mate selection and self-domestication may have been stronger and more refined in A. ramidus than what we see in bonobos."

Further research has confirmed that Ardipithecus possessed paedomorphic cranial base angulation, position of the foramen magnum as well as vocal tract dimensions. This was interpreted as not only evidence of a change in social behavior but also a potentially early emergence of hominid vocal capability. If this thesis is correct then not only human social behavior but also language ability originally evolved through paedomorphic skull morphogenesis via the process of self-domestication.

The most comprehensive case for human self-domestication has been proposed for the changes that account for the much later transition from robust humans such as Neanderthals or Denisovans to anatomically modern humans. Occurring between 40,000 and 25,000 years ago, this rapid neotenization has been explained as the result of cultural selection of mating partners on the basis of variables lacking evolutionary benefits, such as perceived attractiveness, facial symmetry, youth, specific body ratios, skin tone or hair, none of which play any role in any other animal species. This unintentional auto-domestication, coinciding with the introduction of imagery of female sexuality, occurred simultaneously in four continents then occupied by hominins. It led to rapid changes typical for domestication, such as in cranial morphology, skeletal architecture, reduction in brain volume, to playful and exploratory behavior, and the establishment of thousands of deleterious conditions, syndromes, disorders and illnesses presumed absent in robust humans.

Of course, these specific views are very clearly based on multi-regionalist perspectives of human evolution which claim modern human populations evolved from relevant archaics present in each world region, as demonstrated in robust skeletal fossils. Such views are largely disproven by genetic evidence supporting the Out of Africa hypothesis with minor inter-breeding and genetic introgression. Despite this, however, human self-domestication entirely within Africa, say, during transition from earlier hominins, especially H. heidelbergensis to H. sapiens remains an open possibility. This would mean archaics in each region (e.g., neanderthals, denisovans) were largely replaced by self-domesticated H. sapiens as they spread around the globe. This possibility suggests self-domestication played a role in the success of H. sapiens, and the extinction of other lineages.  

The idea of self-domestication was used by early Social Darwinism which, according to psychiatrist Martin Brüne in an article "On human self-domestication", developed from the idea that humans could "perfect" themselves biologically. The idea of self-domestication is also related to the concept of sociodicy.

Modern humans

Physical anatomy 
Based on the dating of the fossil record, archaeologists have concluded that self-domestication likely occurred during the Pleistocene, over 300,000 years ago. Using the fossil record to compare Homo sapiens to pre-sapiens ancestors, archaeologists observed many of the same telling phenotypic characteristics that emerge as a consequence of self-domestication in animals. These features include diminished sexual dimorphism, smaller tooth size, reduction of the cranium, and smaller body size. H. sapiens fossils also demonstrated the flattening of brow-ridge projection and shortening of faces.

Reactive aggression 
Richard Wrangham further built upon this body of research, addressing how bonobos and chimpanzees could elucidate development of aggression in humans. Academics have raised concerns with inconsistencies with the self-domestication hypothesis, pointing out that it isn't logical that humans could potentially be domesticated given the profundity of violent acts for which they are responsible. Reconciling this paradox, Wrangham posited that self-domestication is the outcome of two different kinds of aggression: proactive and reactive aggression.

Proactive aggression, which is commonly observed in chimpanzees, is defined as an attack that was planned, motivated by achieving an end goal. Generally, humans demonstrate lower aggression within groups. Reactive aggression, much more closely associated with anger, is characterized as an immediate response to a threat—the human equivalent being "bar fights". Aligned with the behavior of self-domesticated bonobos, humans do not have a high propensity for reactive aggression. This lends further evidence to supporting the self-domestication hypothesis, of which reduced reactive aggression is a central trait.

Population density hypothesis 
The population density hypothesis attempts to explain the decreased reactive aggression that is observed in modern humans. During periods of high population density, higher tolerance of associates may be favored due to an increased reliance upon social networks for reliable access to otherwise limited, scarce resources like food. H. sapiens began to exhibit this higher degree of social tolerance approximately 300,000 years ago, which—if this hypothesis upholds—would be associated with a higher population size. However, recent genetic data has currently put this hypothesis to rest, as H. sapiens actually underwent a population decline about 200,000 years ago.

Language-based conspiracy 
The language-based conspiracy provides a convincing argument—and is currently the best-supported theory—explaining why reactive aggression was selected against in modern humans, thereby resulting in self-domestication. H. sapiens are theorized to have developed an elegant propensity for language that surpassed its predecessors, including H. neanderthalensis. Enhanced linguistic ability would have allowed for greater suppression and control over a power-hungry member of early hunter-gatherer societies. Those who attempted to achieve dominance over others would be subject to capital punishment, which was facilitated by shared intentionality from others that was easily communicated through language. Language allowed subordinates to collaborate, coordinating plans to dampen the attempt at dominance by the instigator. Over time, this resulted in the selection against reactive aggression.

Theoretical criticism 
The self-domestication hypothesis has been met with some degree of criticism. Some researchers have argued that the human brain is peramorphic, instead of paedomorphic. Wrangham puts forth that these arguments do not address the evolution of Homo sapiens from their most recent ancestor, instead focusing too heavily on a direct contrast between apes and humans.

See also

 Domestication
 Landrace
 Ethology
 Sociobiology
 Evolutionary psychology
 Synanthrope

References

Further reading
 Brian Hare and Vanessa Woods, "Survival of the Friendliest: Natural selection for hypersocial traits enabled Earth's apex species to best Neandertals and other competitors", Scientific American, vol. 323, no. 2 (August 2020), pp. 58–63.

Domesticated animals